Helio Gallardo Martínez is a Chilean Philosopher and  Professor of the University of Costa Rica. He moved to Costa Rica after Salvador Allende was overthrown.

Books (in Spanish)

	Mitos e ideología en el proceso político chileno. Heredia: EUNA, 1979.
	Pensar en América Latina. Heredia: EUNA, 1981.
	Fundamentos de comprensión de lectura. San José: Nueva Década, 1982.
	Teoría y crisis en América Latina. San José: Nueva Década, 1984.
	Cultura, política, estado. San José: Nueva Década, 1985.
	Elementos de política en América Latina. San José: DEI, 1986.
	Fundamentos de formación política: análisis de coyuntura. San José: DEI, 1988.
	Actores y procesos políticos latinoamericanos. San José: DEI, 1989.
	Crisis del socialismo histórico: ideologías y desafíos. San José: DEI, 1991.
	Elementos de investigación académica San José: EUNED, 1992.
	500 años: Fenomenología del mestizo (violencia y resistencia). San José: DEI, 1993 .
	Habitar la tierra. Bogotá, Colombia: Asamblea Pueblo de Dios, 1997. 112 pp.
	Vigencia y mito de Ernesto Ché Guevara. San José: Editorial de la Universidad de Costa Rica, 1997. 121 pp.
	El fundamento social de la esperanza. Quito: Escuela de Formación de Laicos y Laicas, Vicaría Sur de Quito, Ecuador, 1998.
	Castro/Pinochet. San José, Ediciones Perro Azul, 1999. 100 pp.
	Globalización, lucha social, derechos humanos. San José, Ediciones Perro Azul, 1999. 120 pp.
	(ed.), Pinochet procesado. San José, Ediciones Nueva Década, 1999. 216 pp.
	Abisa a los compañeros, pronto. San José, Ediciones Perro Azul, 2000. 94 pp. Segunda edición, 202 pp.
	Política y transformación social. Discusión sobre Derechos Humanos. Quito, Serpaj, 2000. 308pp.
	Adquisición de un automóvil. San José, Ediciones Perro Azul, 2001.
	Para subir al Jomalú. San José, Ediciones Perro Azul, 2002.

External links
 Pensar America Latina (Personal Website)
 La autoestima necesaria

Philosophy academics
Chilean philosophers
Academic staff of the University of Costa Rica
Chilean emigrants to Costa Rica
Living people
Year of birth missing (living people)